Can't Say Goodbye is a 2017 Spanish drama film directed by  starring Juan Diego, Nathalie Poza and Lola Dueñas.

Plot 
José Luis is diagnosed with a terminal lung cancer. His two daughters, Carla and Blanca, react to the news in different ways.

Cast

Production 
Can't Say Goodbye, Lino Escalera's feature film debut, was penned by Escalera alongside Pablo Remón. Other duties were entrusted to Santiago Racaj (cinematography), Miguel Doblado (editing) and Pablo Trujillo (score). The film was produced by Lolita Films, Mediaevs and White Leaf Producciones and it had the collaboration of ICAA, Castilla-La Mancha IV Centenario Cervantes and ECAM. Shooting began on 12 April 2016. Shooting locations included Girona, Salt, Llançà, Roses, Olot, and Almería.

Release 
The film had its world premiere at the Málaga Spanish Film Festival (FMCE) on 20 March 2017. Distributed by Súper 8 Distribución, it was theatrically released in Spain on 19 May 2017.

Reception 
Jonathan Holland of The Hollywood Reporter deemed Can't Say Goodbye to be an "austere, thought-provoking and wonderfully acted" film, having as hallmarks "a trio of sterling performances and an unwavering eye on emotional authenticity", concluding that it was a "a troubling but rewarding emotional X-ray".

Andrea G. Bermejo of Cinemanía rated the film with 4 out of 5 stars, considering that "it is like a slap in the face that wakes you up", writing that Nathalie Poza was knocking on the doors of all film awards with her performance, "managing to narrate without words what happens to her character inside".

Awards and nominations 

|-
| align = "center" rowspan = "4" | 2017 || rowspan = "4" | Málaga Film Festival || colspan = "2" | Silver Biznaga for Jury's Special Award ||  || rowspan = "4" | 
|-
| Silver Biznaga for Best Actress || Nathalie Poza || 
|-
| Silver Biznaga for Best Supporting Actor || Juan Diego || 
|-
| Silver Biznaga for Best Screenplay || Juan Remón, Lino Escalera || 
|-
| align = "center" rowspan = "15" | 2018 
| rowspan = "2" | 23rd Forqué Awards || Best Actress || Nathalie Poza ||  || rowspan = "2" | 
|-
| Best Actor || Juan Diego || 
|-
| rowspan = "5" | 5th Feroz Awards || colspan = "2" | Best Drama Film ||  || rowspan = "5" | 
|-
| Best Screenplay || Pablo Remón, Lino Escalera || 
|-
| Best Actress (film) || Nathalie Poza || 
|-
| Best Supporting Actress (film) || Lola Dueñas || 
|-
| Best Supporting Actor (film) || Juan Diego || 
|-
| rowspan = "3" | 73rd CEC Medals || Best Actress || Nathalie Poza ||  || rowspan = "3" | 
|-
| Best Supporting Actress || Lola Dueñas || 
|-
| Best New Director || Lino Escalera || 
|-
| rowspan = "3" | 32nd Goya Awards || Best Actress || Nathalie Poza ||  || rowspan = "3" | 
|-
| Best Supporting Actress || Lola Dueñas || 
|-
| Best New Director || Lino Escalera || 
|-
| rowspan = "2" | 27th Actors and Actresses Union Awards || Best Film Actress in a Leading Role || Nathalie Poza ||  || rowspan = "2" | 
|-
| Best Film Actor in a Secondary Role || Juan Diego || 
|}

See also 
 List of Spanish films of 2017

References

External links

2017 films
Spanish drama films
Spanish comedy films
2010s Spanish-language films
2017 drama films
Films shot in Almería
Films shot in the province of Girona
2010s Spanish films